The London to Brighton Veteran Car Run is the world's longest-running motoring event, held on a course between London and Brighton, England. To qualify, participating cars must have been built before 1905. It is also the world's largest gathering of veteran cars. The first edition, "The Emancipation Run" in 1896, celebrated the recently passed Locomotives on Highways Act 1896, which liberalised motor vehicle laws in the United Kingdom.

The run has taken place most years since its initial revival in 1927. There are two official stops along the way: Crawley (for coffee) and Preston Park (in a suburb of Brighton). Preston Park is the official finishing point; the cars then proceed to Madeira Drive on the seafront, also the venue for Brighton's other big motoring event, the Brighton Speed Trials.

Any that finish (many do not) before 4:30 PM are awarded a medal.

There are a few other events preceding the Veteran Car Run, such as the Motoring Forum, the Veteran Car Run Sale, a motor show, and a participant reception.

History

1896 Emancipation Run
The run was also the first meet of the Motor Car Club, of which Lawson was president.

The event started with a breakfast at the Charing Cross Hotel, which included the symbolic tearing in two by Lord Winchelsea of a red flag. It is sometimes claimed that the Emancipation Run celebrated the abandoning of the requirement for the escort to carry such a flag. However, the red flag requirement (from the 1865 act) had long since been removed by the 1878 act.

The competitors gathered outside the Metropole Hotel (now the Corinthia Hotel London), with the cars accompanied by a "flying escort" – estimated by one witness as "probably 10,000" – of pedal cyclists, recreational cycling having become popular with the English in the final decades of the 19th century. A total of 33 motorists set off from London for the coast and 17 arrived in Brighton. The first of the cars set off from London at 10:30 am and the first arrival in Brighton, by a Duryea Motor Wagon, beating the next closest Brighton arrivals by more than an hour. Two Duryea cars participated in the run, marking the first appearance of American motor vehicles in Europe. Louise Bazalgette, one of the earliest women motorists in Britain, was photographed at the start of the event on an Arnold motor car, with her friend Henry Hewetson.

Subsequent runs
The London to Brighton run was not staged again until 1927. Since then it has run annually, except from the onset of the Second World War up to 1947 owing to petrol rationing, and in 2020 due to the COVID-19 pandemic. With all this considered, it is the world's longest running motoring event. Since 1930, the event has been controlled by the Royal Automobile Club (RAC).

Participants

Many racing drivers and celebrities have taken part in the event, including Richard Shuttleworth (1928–1934; 1936–1938), S. C. H. "Sammy" Davis, Sir Malcolm Campbell, Prince Bira, George Eyston, Richard Seaman, Kaye Don, George Formby, Phil Hill, Stirling Moss, Jochen Mass, Nigel Mansell and Damon Hill

The 72nd anniversary run took place in 1968 and was joined by celebrity participants Prince Rainier and Princess Grace of Monaco, in a 1903 De Dion-Bouton. That year Stirling Moss also participated, driving a 1903 four-cylinder Mercedes.

Some participants dress up in a late Victorian or Edwardian style of clothing. In 1971 Queen Elizabeth II was a passenger in a 1900 Daimler. A regular participant is Prince Michael of Kent.

RAC Brighton to London Future Car Challenge

In 2010 the RAC launched the Brighton to London Future Car Challenge, following the same route as the veteran car run, but starting in Brighton and finishing at Regent Street, London – and taking place on the day prior to the veteran run. The event is intended to showcase low energy impact vehicles of various technologies – Electric, Hybrid and Low-Emission ICE (internal combustion engine). Participants compete to minimise energy consumption using "road legal" vehicles in "real world" conditions.

The results of the inaugural 2010 event showed that the electric vehicles used the least energy ( on average, or  petrol equivalent), compared to the hybrid vehicles ( average,  petrol equivalent) and the largely diesel powered internal combustion engine vehicles ( average,  petrol equivalent).

1896 results
The event was not organised as a race, but the general classification of the fastest finishers was:

In popular culture
The 1953 comedy film Genevieve is set during one of these runs.
An episode of ChuckleVision, "Wheels of Misfortune", first aired on 15 January 1997, is set during one of these runs.

See also
 London to Brighton events

Notes

References

External links

Official website
LBVCR 2010 Information
Veteran Car Club of Great Britain's page about LBVCR
Cuckfield Companion's page about LBVCR
Sponsor Renault Sport's page about LBVCR
1950s cine film (no sound)
London to Brighton Veteran Car Run (LBVCR) flickr.com group
Future Car Challenge website
LBVCR Press Release relating to Historic Electric Vehicles
A US version of the car run, from New London to New Brighton.

Brighton and Hove
Brighton
Automotive events
Recurring events established in 1896